¡Ay, Carmela! is a play by José Sanchis Sinisterra.  It is set in the opening months of the Spanish Civil War. Heavily allegorical, it tells the story of travelling players, Carmela and Paulino, who blunder into the wrong place at the wrong time. A film of the same name — ¡Ay, Carmela! — was released in 1990. The play takes its name from a popular Spanish Civil war song Ay Carmela.

Originally written in Spanish, it toured in 2006 in the UK in English.

Scripts
Ñaque, ¡Ay, Carmela! by José Sanchis Sinisterra (Spanish, paperback), Ediciones Catedra, 1991. 
Ay, Carmela! by José Sanchis Sinisterra, trans. John London (English, paperback), New Theatre Publications, 2003.

US premiere, Gala Theater, Washington DC, Sep 15 - Oct 9, 2011
Gala Theater, Washington DC, Sep 15 - Oct 9, 2011 
GALA Hispanic Theatre presents ¡Ay, Carmela!
Wide-ranging and stirring ¡Ay, Carmela! at GALA Theatre
The life and death of a Spanish dancer
¡Ay, Carmela! se estrena en Washington dirigida por José Luis Arellano
Love and war at Gala

References

1990 plays
Spanish plays
Spanish Civil War in popular culture